Klang Parade is a shopping complex in Klang, Selangor, Malaysia with anchor tenants such as Econsave, Parkson, Golden Screen Cinemas and Peninsula College. Mini anchors include Kamdar, Dynasty Dragon, E-Digital, Mr DIY, Next Food Junction, Voir, Brands Outlet, and Original Classics (OC). As of March 2019, the mall's net lettable area (NLA) of 675,407 sq. ft. and it is reported to be 98.6%  tenanted.

History
Klang Parade was established in 1995. It was built and operated by the Lion Group. The mall was sold to ARA Asia Dragon Fund in 2012 and was closed between July 2013 and January 2014 for a major refurbishment. It is now owned by ARA Harmony III and managed by ARA Asset Management Limited (ARA).

The mall underwent major refurbishment in 2013 and was reopened in 2014 with a total built-up area of 1,704,610 sq ft. The newly refreshed family-centric venue doubles as a massive event space, which has played host to a variety of events such as the annual Shuddup N’ Dance competitions attended by local and regional street dancers.

Awards won
 International Property Award (2016 – 2017)
 Klang's Best Managed Facilities for the Disabled Award 2018 
 Klang's Cleanest Public Toilet (Mall) Award 2018

Corporate information
Klang Parade (along with four other malls in Malaysia: Citta Mall, 1 Mont Kiara, Ipoh Parade, and AEON Bandaraya Melaka) is managed by ARA Asset Management Limited (ARA), a premier global integrated real assets fund manager. As at 30 June 2019, Gross Assets Managed by ARA Group and its Associates is more than S$83 billion across over 100 cities in 23 countries.

Access

Buses
Klang Parade is accessible via the following 96 Seranas and Smart Selangor bus services. Stations serving the mall are located at both sides of Jalan Meru and Jalan Pekan Baru.

 - Hentian Klang - Klang Parade, Jalan Meru - Hentian Klang
 - SRJK ( C ) Kong Hoe, Jalan Batu Tiga Lama - Kawasan Perniagaan Jalan Pekan Baru - SRJK ( C ) Kong Hoe, Jalan Batu Tiga Lama

Rail
The mall will be connected to the  LRT Shah Alam line via  Jalan Meru station. The construction of the Bandar Utama–Klang line is scheduled to be completed in 2024.

References

External links
Klang Parade
Peninsula College

Shopping malls in Selangor
Shopping malls established in 1995
Klang (city)